This is a list of NUTS2 statistical regions of Hungary by Human Development Index as of 2023 with data for the year 2021.

References 

Hungary
Hungary
Economy of Hungary